Avinesh Rekhi is an Indian television actor known for his performances in Madhubala – Ek Ishq Ek Junoon, Tu Sooraj Main Saanjh, Piyaji and Choti Sarrdaarni.

Life and career

Personal life

Rekhi married his girlfriend of 8 years, Raisa, on 29 December 2010. They have two children, a son and a daughter.

Films journey

Rekhi began his career with a small role in the 2008 film Ru Ba Ru. Another unnoticed role in the 2009 film Dil Bole Hadippa! failed to earn him fame.

Television career
Rekhi's first television show was Colors TV's suspense thriller Chhal — Sheh Aur Maat in 2012, where he played the lead character Kabir Jaiswal.

In 2013, he was seen as the antagonist Sultan Kundra in Colors TV's Madhubala – Ek Ishq Ek Junoon. From 2013 to 2014, he essayed the parallel lead Neeraj Sachdeva in the psychological thriller Main Naa Bhoolungi.

In 2015, Rekhi bagged the role of Mughal emperor Akbar in Sony Entertainment Television's historical period drama Bharat Ka Veer Putra – Maharana Pratap. He then had an episodic role on &TV's Darr Sabko Lagta Hai in 2016.

His first major breakthrough show was Star Plus's Tu Sooraj Main Saanjh, Piyaji which began airing in April 2017. In the show he starred as the main lead Uma Shankar Toshniwal opposite Rhea Sharma.

From July 2019 to July 2021, Rekhi starred as Sarabjit Singh Gill in Colors TV's Choti Sarrdaarni alongside Nimrit Kaur Ahluwala.

Filmography

Films 

Ru Ba Ru
Dil Bole Hadippa!

Television

References

External links

Living people
Indian male film actors
Indian male television actors
Male actors from Mumbai
Year of birth missing (living people)